José de Jesús Garibay García (born 24 November 1946) is a Mexican politician affiliated with the Party of the Democratic Revolution. As of 2014 he served as Senator of the LX Legislature of the Mexican Congress representing Michoacán as replacement of Leonel Godoy Rangel. He also served as Deputy during the LVII Legislature.

References

1946 births
Living people
Politicians from Michoacán
Members of the Senate of the Republic (Mexico)
Members of the Chamber of Deputies (Mexico)
Party of the Democratic Revolution politicians
21st-century Mexican politicians